Director General of Border Guards Bangladesh (abbreviated as BGB) also known as 'Border Guards chief' is the professional head of the Border Guards Bangladesh (previously Bangladesh Rifles). The current DG is Major General A K M Nazmul Hasan. The first BGB chief was General Chitta Ranjan Datta.

The Director General  functions from the Bangladesh Border Guards Headquarters, which is located in the Pilkhana, Dhaka.

List of Director Generals of Border Guards Bangladesh

References

Director Generals of Border Guards Bangladesh